Kill Speed (also called Fast Glass) is a 2010 action film directed by Kim Bass, who is a commercial rated pilot. It stars Andrew Keegan, Brandon Quinn, Nick Carter, Natalia Cigliuti and Greg Grunberg in an aviation-themed crime/thriller drama.

The soundtrack features music by:  Steppenwolf, Tears for Fears, Nick Carter, Jada Pinkett-Smith’s Wicked Wisdom, and Nathan East.

Plot
Best friends Strayger (Andrew Keegan), Rainman (Brandon Quinn) and Forman (Nick Carter) calling themselves "Fly Guyz" come up with a scheme to fund their Hollywood, rock-star lifestyle. Using high speed aircraft to deliver Mexican manufactured illegal crystal meth for drug baron Escondido (Christian Monzon) throughout rural California is the way they make their money. They team up with computer techie Einstein (Graham Norris). Rosanna (Natalia Cigliuti) joins the gang, but she is not who she pretends to be. When the DIA agent Jonas Moore (Greg Grunberg) offers a deal to rescue a DIA agent captured by the Mexican cartel, in exchange for their freedom, the friends have to fly once again.

Cast
 Andrew Keegan as Strayger
 Brandon Quinn as Rainman 
 Natalia Cigliuti as Rosanna 
 Nick Carter as Forman 
 Reno Wilson as Kyle Jackson 
 Greg Grunberg as Jonas Moore 
 Christian Monzon as Escondido 
 Graham Norris as Einstein
 Tom Arnold as Rhaynes
 Bill Goldberg as Big Bad John 
 Robert Patrick as President 
 Joshua Alba as Vasquez
 Big Rick Hoffman as Biker Henchman #1
 Chris Maida as Biker Henchman #2
 Chris Callen as Biker Henchman #3

Production

Under the working title of Fast Glass, principal photography on location took place in 2008 at the desert areas in California City, California. Additional sequences were shot in Los Angeles. Kill Speed used a combination of fast-paced filming that involves jet and piston-powered aircraft gives the film a Top Gun (1986) and Fast and the Furious (2001–2015) vibe. Originally intended as a direct-to-video film. a release in 2010 overseas preceded its US release. While originally scheduled for release in 2008, the film was held up in contractual difficulties until 2010.

The film incorporates air-to-air filming of actual aircraft (including 300 mph propeller driven, experimental race aircraft and ex-military Aero L-39 Albatros jet trainers) with all the actors actually in the aircraft and, according to the producers, the first time in films that actors were at the controls while delivering dialogue.

Reception
Kill Speed was premiered at the 2009 American Film Market (AFM) industry showcase, as "perhaps the most talked about film at AFM 2009." The controversy over rights had spilled over into lawsuits, with the resultant publicity probably making the film notable.

With its unabashed straight-to-video format, Kill Speed did not receive positive critical reactions. Dan Whitehead called it "an amateurish mess."  UK Film reviewer Andy Webb of The Movie Scene noted: "... the shifting tone is not the movies only issue as the dialogue is also an issue with some terrible lines. I am not just on about the intentionally humorous lines but those lines which are supposed to be serious but end up cheesy.

Aerial scenes, however, featured strong production values and elicited the most positive responses from viewers. "What initially is very positive about "Kill Speed" stands out is the amazing quality production! Jump Cuts, Fast forward and stylish slow motion shots alternate with cool images of the American/Mexican border region."

References

External links
 
 

American aviation films
American action thriller films
2010 action thriller films
2010 films
2010s English-language films
2010s American films